
Elena Vladimirovna Pitjeva (Елена Владимировна Питьева) is a Russian astronomer working at the Institute of Applied Astronomy, Russian Academy of Sciences, St. Petersburg. She has published over 100 articles, as listed in Google Scholar and the Astrophysics Data System in the field of solar system dynamics and celestial mechanics.

She began employment activity as an engineer-observer at the Astrophysical observation station of the Astronomical Observatory of Leningrad State University in Byurakan (Armenia). Then Pitjeva worked at the Institute of Theoretical Astronomy of the USSA Academy of Science and the Institute Applied Astronomy RAS since the date of its foundation in 1988 as researcher and senior researcher. At present she is head of the Laboratory of Ephemeris Astronomy of this institute.

Major research interests of Pitjeva include the construction of numerical ephemerides of the planets, the determination of the planets' and asteroids' masses, the parameters of planet rotation and planetary topography, the solar corona and oblateness and general relativity testing. She is one of creators of the numerical Ephemerides of Planets and the Moon (EPM) of IAA RAS that originated in the seventies of the past century and have been developed since that time.  The version of the EPM2004 ephemeris has been adopted as the ephemeris basis of Russian Astronomical Yearbook since 2006. The updated EPM2008 ephemerides are available to outside users via ftp.

The works of Pitjeva have recently been used by several scientists to test several models of modified gravity in the Solar System.
Pitjeva has also contributed to a better understanding an influence of asteroids and Trans-Neptunian Objects on the planets' motion. Recently Pitjeva collaborated with E. Myles Standish and proposed to the IAU Working Group on Numerical Standards for Fundamental Astronomy (NSFA) the values of the masses of the three largest asteroids, the Moon-Earth mass ratio and the astronomical unit in meters, mainly obtained while fitting the constructed DE (JPL) and EPM (IAA RAS) planet ephemerides. These values have been adopted by the 27 General Assembly of International Astronomical Union as Current Best Estimates as the IAU (2009) System of Astronomical Constants.
Pitjeva is a member of the International Astronomical Union: OC of Commission 4 “Ephemerides”,
Commission 52 “Relativity in Fundamental Astronomy” 
IAU WG NSFA.”,

Education
Pitjeva graduated from the Faculty of Mathematical and Mechanical at Leningrad State University in 1972 in the specialty of astronomy. Pitjeva gained her PhD in the field of "Astrometry and Celestial Mechanics" in 1994, with the thesis “Improvement of ephemerides of the major planets and determination of some astronomical constants by radar observations", and earned the Doctor of Science degree, the highest (after PhD) scientific degree in Russia, with the thesis "Construction of high-precision ephemerides of the major planets and determination of some astronomical constants", in 2005. Pitjeva is a pupil of Georgij A. Krasinsky and Victor A. Brumberg.

Publications (selection)

Bibliometric information 
According to the NASA ADS database, the h-index of E.V. Pitjeva is 9, with a total number of citations (self-citations excluded) equal to 316.

References

External links
Laboratory of Ephemeris Astronomy, Institute of Applied Astronomy
Pitjeva E.V. website at IAU

Russian astronomers
Women astronomers
Living people
Year of birth missing (living people)